After the Snow is the second studio album by Modern English, released in May 1982 by 4AD in the United Kingdom, Vertigo Records in Canada, and Sire Records in the United States. It spawned three singles, including the worldwide hit "I Melt with You".

Content 
It features the original recording of the tune "I Melt with You," which the band would later re-record in 1990 for their album Pillow Lips. The song "After The Snow" has two speed fluctuations on the original LP which may or may not be intentional.

Reception 

Record reviewer Nick Burton gave After the Snow a mixed review, saying that the album's eccentric mix of genres and styles lacks direction but is interesting nonetheless. He  warned readers that the hit "I Melt with You" is completely unrepresentative of the album, and concluded that "If nothing else, After the Snow provides some offbeat, if not unintentionally amusing, listening."

Track listing 
All songs written and arranged by Richard Brown, Michael Conroy, Robbie Grey, Gary McDowell, and Stephen Walker.

Personnel 
Modern English
Robbie Grey – vocals
Gary McDowell – guitars
Stephen Walker – keyboards
Michael Conroy – bass, violin
Richard Brown – drums, percussion

Additional personnel
Hugh Jones – additional keyboards, backing vocals, production, engineering
Faith – flute on "Carry Me Down"

References

External links 

1982 albums
Modern English (band) albums
Albums produced by Hugh Jones (producer)
Sire Records albums
4AD albums